There have been three ships of the United States Navy named USS Rhode Island, after the American state.

, a wooden sidewheel steamer previously named John P. King and Eagle, and later renamed Charleston that saw action in the Civil War.
, a Virginia-class battleship, sailed on the first leg of the Great White Fleet's voyage, and provided anti-submarine services during World War I.
, an Ohio-class submarine, laid down in 1981, and renamed  soon after.
, an Ohio-class submarine launched in 1993

United States Navy ship names